Shambhunath Municipality is a Town in Saptari District in the Sagarmatha Zone of south-eastern Nepal. Merging the existing Khoksar Parbaha, Shambhunath, Mohanpur, Bhangha, Basbalpur and Rampur Jamuwa village development committee this new municipality was formed on 18 May 2014. Kathauna Bazar is now finally head office of this new municipality . At the time of the 1991 Nepal census it had a population of 5168 people living in 933 individual households.

References 

Populated places in Saptari District
VDCs in Saptari District
Nepal municipalities established in 2014
Municipalities in Madhesh Province